Tonopah Bombing Range was the original southern Nevada military area designated in 1940 (cf. the current Nevada Test and Training Range) and may refer to:
Tonopah General Range, the smaller 1941 area designated when the "Tonopah Gunnery and Bombing Range" was divided (cf. Las Vegas General Area)
Tonopah Army Air Field, the range's main base first manned by the 1942 "Bombing and Gunnery Range Detachment"
Tonopah Bombing and Gunnery Range, the 1947 designation prior to the 1949 merger of the 2 areas (cf. Las Vegas Bombing and Gunnery Range)
Tonopah Air Force Base, the name of the range's main base after  transfer to the USAF
Tonopah Test Range, a 1956 area established for nuclear testing (cf. the "instrumented AEC range at Tonopah" used by the Navy in 1957.)
Tonopah Bombing Range (FUDS), the area of the former AFB and the portion of the 1940 range that are outside of the current range

Bombing ranges
Installations of the United States Army Air Forces